Qin Zhijian (born 1976) is a former male Chinese international table tennis player and current coach.

Playing career
He has won four World Championship medals. He won the bronze medal at the 1999 World Table Tennis Championships and a gold medal at the 2001 World Table Tennis Championships with Yang Ying and two bronze's at the 2003 World Table Tennis Championships with Ma Lin and Niu Jianfeng respectively.

Coaching
In 2017 he became the China national table tennis team Men's first team coach. Before that, he was the personal coach of Ma Long since 2006 who he developed and trained into a Grand Slam Champion.

See also
 List of table tennis players

References

Living people
1976 births
Chinese male table tennis players
People from Zhenjiang
Table tennis players from Jiangsu
World Table Tennis Championships medalists
Chinese table tennis coaches